Nawalparasi (West of Bardaghat Susta) district or Nawalparasi West, as known commonly, also frequently referred to as just Parasi District, is a district located in Lumbini Province of Nepal. It is 1 out of 12 districts of Lumbini Province. The headquarter of the district is located in Ramgram.

Formerly, Nawalparasi West was a part of Nawalparasi District, the other part being Nawalparasi East  (natively called Nawalpur). Thus, the districts Nawalparasi (West of Bardaghat Susta) and Nawalparasi (East of Bardaghat Susta) were created after the state's reconstruction of administrative divisions as of 20 September 2015.

Bhojpuri is the local language of the district.

Demographics
At the time of the 2011 Nepal census, Parasi District had a population of 331,904. Of these, 55.7% spoke Bhojpuri, 26.8% Nepali, 8.7% Tharu, 3.3% Maithili, 2.8% Magar, 1.2% Gurung, 0.4% Newar, 0.3% Tamang, 0.1% Bhujel, 0.1% Doteli, 0.1% Hindi, 0.1% Urdu and 0.1% other languages as their first language.

In terms of ethnicity/caste, 18.4% were Tharu, 11.5% Hill Brahmin, 7.4% Chamar/Harijan/Ram, 6.9% Musalman, 6.4% Magar, 5.8% Yadav, 4.6% Chhetri, 3.5% Kewat, 3.3% Teli, 2.9% Kami, 2.0% Kahar, 1.9% Gurung, 1.8% Koiri/Kushwaha, 1.7% Dhobi, 1.7% Kurmi, 1.6% Dusadh/Pasawan/Pasi, 1.5% Kathabaniyan, 1.4% Rajbhar, 1.3% other Terai, 1.1% Musahar, 1.1% Newar, 1.0% Damai/Dholi, 0.9% Hajam/Thakur, 0.9% Sanyasi/Dasnami, 0.8% Mallaha, 0.7% Kumal, 0.6% Bin, 0.6% Lohar, 0.6% Thakuri, 0.5% Badhaee, 0.5% Gaderi/Bhedidar, 0.5% Halwai, 0.5% Tamang, 0.4% Kalwar, 0.4% Sarki, 0.3% Terai Brahmin, 0.2% Baraee, 0.2% other Dalit, 0.2% Dhankar/Dharikar, 0.2% Dhunia, 0.2% Khawas, 0.2% Kumhar, 0.2% Rajput, 0.1% Badi, 0.1% Bengali, 0.1% Darai, 0.1% Dom, 0.1% Gharti/Bhujel, 0.1% Kayastha, 0.1% Mali, 0.1% Pattharkatta/Kushwadiya, 0.1% Rai, 0.1% Sonar, 0.1% Yakkha and 0.1% others.

In terms of religion, 88.5% were Hindu, 6.8% Muslim, 3.4% Buddhist, 0.8% Christian, 0.1% Bon, 0.1% Kirati and 0.1% others.

In terms of literacy, 66.6% could read and write, 2.0% could only read and 31.3% could neither read nor write.

Divisions
The district is divided into 7 local level body in which 3 are urban municipality and 4 are rural municipality.

Urban municipality
 Bardaghat
 Ramgram
 Sunwal

Rural municipality
 Susta Rural Municipality
 Palhinandan Rural Municipality
 Pratappur Rural Municipality
 Sarawal Rural Municipality

See also
 People's Progressive Party
 Nawalpur District

References

External links
 MoFALD
 DCC Nawalparasi

 
Districts of Nepal established in 2015